"Vámonos" (transl. "Let's Go") is a song recorded by Dutch DJ trio Kris Kross Amsterdam, Mexican-American singer Ally Brooke, and Dominican rapper Messiah. It was released on 23 November 2018.

Background
"Vámonos" is a Latin pop song featuring artists Ally Brooke and Messiah. A lyric video for the song was released on 23 November 2018. It is sung in Spanish and has a heavy up beat dance theme to it. The song was released through Latium Entertainment and Atlantic Records. Brooke performed the song alone prior to its release at the 2018 ALMA Awards.

Track listing
Digital download
"Vámonos" – 2:56

The Remixes
"Vámonos" (Curbi Remix) – 2:24
"Vámonos" (LNY TNZ Remix) – 3:08
"Vámonos" – 2:56

Charts

References

2018 songs
2018 singles
Ally Brooke songs
Songs written by Boaz van de Beatz